Wyarno is an unincorporated community in central Sheridan County, Wyoming, United States. Although Wyarno is unincorporated, it has a post office, with the ZIP code of 82845. Public education in the community of Wyarno is provided by Sheridan County School District #2.

Geography
There are few populated places to the east of Wyarno. The BNSF Railway line between Sheridan and Gillette passes by town.

References

Unincorporated communities in Sheridan County, Wyoming
Unincorporated communities in Wyoming